The Bible translations into Latin date back to classical antiquity.

Latin translations of the Bible were used in the Western part of the former Roman Empire until the Reformation. Those translations are still used along with translations from Latin into the vernacular within the Roman Catholic Church.

Pre-Christian Latin translations
The large Jewish diaspora in the Second Temple period made use of vernacular translations of the Hebrew Bible, including the Aramaic Targum and Greek Septuagint. Though there is no certain evidence of a pre-Christian Latin translation of the Hebrew Bible, some scholars have suggested that Jewish congregations in Rome and the Western part of the Roman Empire may have used Latin translations of fragments of the Hebrew Bible.

Early Christian and medieval Latin translations 
Early Latin versions are divided into Vetus Latina and Vulgate. Vetus Latina manuscripts, also called Old Latin or Itala, are so called not because they are written in Old Latin (i.e. Latin prior to 75 BC), but because they are the oldest versions of the New Testament in Latin.

Unlike the Vulgate, the Vetus Latina tradition reflects numerous distinct, similar, and not entirely independent translations of various New Testament texts, extending back to the time of the original Greek autographs.

In 382 CE, Jerome began a revision of the existing Vetus Latina Gospels into contemporary Latin, corrected against manuscripts in the original Greek. Acts, Pauline epistles, Catholic epistles and the Apocalypse are Vetus Latina considered as being made by Pelagian groups or by Rufinus the Syrian. Those texts and others are known as the Vulgate, a compound text that is not entirely Jerome's work.

The Vetus Latina, "Old Latin" 

The earliest known translations into Latin consist of a number of piecework translations during the early Church period. Collectively, these versions are known as the Vetus Latina and closely follow the Greek Septuagint. The Septuagint was the usual source for these anonymous translators, and they reproduce its variations from the Hebrew Masoretic Text.  They were never rendered independently from the Hebrew or Greek; they vary widely in readability and quality, and contain many solecisms in idiom, some by the translators themselves, others from literally translating Greek language idioms into Latin.

The Biblia Vulgata, "Common Bible" 
Earlier translations progressively replaced by Jerome's Vulgate version of the Bible.

Apart from full Old Testaments, there are more versions of the Psalms only, three of them by Jerome, one from the Hexapla, and one from the Hebrew. Other main versions include the Versio ambrosiana ("Ambrosian version") and the Versio Piana ("version of Pius" ). See the main Vulgate article for a comparison of Psalm 94.

Early modern Latin versions 
Some printed Latin translations were produced by early 16th-century scholars such as Erasmus, derived from his Greek printed version, the Novum Instrumentum omne, the first published example of the Textus Receptus. The Complutensian Polyglot Bible followed shortly after.

In 1527, Xanthus Pagninus produced his Veteris et Novi Testamenti nova translatio, notable for its literal rendering of the Hebrew. This version was also the first to introduce verse numbers in the New Testament, although the system used here did not become widely adopted; the system used in Robertus Stephanus's Vulgate would later become the standard for dividing the New Testament.

Reformation-era Protestant Latin translations 
During the Protestant Reformation, several new Latin translations were produced:
 Sebastian Münster produced a new Latin version of the Old Testament, and gave an impetus to Old Testament study at the time.
 Theodore Beza prepared a Latin translation for his new edition of the Greek New Testament.
 Sebastian Castellio produced  in elegant Ciceronian Latin. It was published in 1551.
 Immanuel Tremellius, together with Franciscus Junius (the elder), published a Latin version of the Old Testament (complete with the deuterocanonical books), which became famous among Protestants. Later editions of their version were accompanied by the Latin version of the Greek New Testament by Beza, and influenced the KJV translators.
 Sebastian Schmidt (1617–1696) a Lutheran theologian and Bible translator. Published the Biblia Sacra sive Testamentum Vetus et Novum ex linguis originalibus in linguam Latinam translatum, in Strasbourg (Argentina) in 1696.

Sixto-Clementine Vulgate

Metrical translations of the Psalms (16th c.) 
Metrical Latin Bible translations are primarily Psalm paraphrases, or paraphrases of Song of Songs, Lamentations, in Latin verse which appeared in the 16th century, then abruptly disappeared.

Nova Vulgata 

In 1907 Pope Pius X proposed that the Latin text of the Vulgate be recovered using the principles of textual criticism as a basis for a new official translation of the Bible into Latin. This revision ultimately led to the Nova Vulgata issued by Pope John Paul II in 1979.

Comparison of John 3:16 in different Latin versions

Notes

References

Latin
Latin-language literature
Translations into Latin